Speckles: The Tarbosaurus (점박이: 한반도의 공룡 3D: Jumbagi: Hanbandoui gongryong 3D; ENG: Speckles: Dinosaurs of the Korean Peninsula) is a 2012 3D South Korean computer-generated epic adventure drama film directed by Han Sang-Ho. The film was released under the title Dino King: An Amazing Adventure in the United States. The Dino King was released sometime after a two-part documentary movie that serves as prequel/predecessor, Tarbosaurus: The Mightiest Ever, and is followed by Dino King 3D: Journey to Fire Mountain, both also being directed by Han Sang-Ho .

Plot 

80 million years ago, during the Cretaceous period, a young Tarbosaurus named Speckles, for his unique birthmark, lives with his older brother, Quicks, twin sisters, and mother. Speckles is left alone when a rogue Tyrannosaurus named One-Eye causes a massive stampede to kill Speckles' siblings, and personally kills his mother, in order to usurp their territory.

Four years later, Speckles has scraped by on his own, scavenging and raiding nests. One day while attempting to steal food from One-Eye, Speckles encounters a female Tarbosaurus named "Blue-Eyes" and the pair team up to hunt and survive together. Over the years, Speckles and Blue-Eyes attempt to maintain a hunting territory away from One-Eye. Eventually, however, One-Eye discovers their hunting grounds and again attempts to usurp their territory. After Blue-Eyes is hurt by One-Eye, Speckles fights him, and eventually defeats and drives away his old nemesis.

After defeating One-Eye, Speckles and Blue-Eyes reclaim Speckles' old family nest and hunting grounds. Now a mature adult pair with three young offspring, the family is happy until forced to flee from their territory due to a volcanic eruption. During the disaster, one of the children is killed and Blue-Eyes is wounded. After this, Speckles becomes the de facto alpha of a large migratory herd of dinosaurs fleeing the natural disaster. Two weeks into the journey, Blue-Eyes collapses from exhaustion. Seeing this, a pack of Velociraptors attacks the family, and though Speckles tries to hold them off, Blue-Eyes dies from her injury, forcing Speckles to leave her body behind in order to save their children.

After a long journey, the herd arrives at a new, fertile area in which to settle. However, Speckles once again encounters One-Eye, who has been driven out by the same natural disaster. Just as he did before, One-Eye causes the herbivores to stampede in order to ambush Speckles and his two babies. One-Eye kills one of Speckle's remaining children whilst the last, Speckles Jr., is knocked off a cliff into the ocean during the ensuing fight. Speckles dives into the sea to save him, but pursued by One-Eye. After a long fight in the ocean, One-Eye is attacked and eaten by a pair of Tylosaurus. Speckles eventually reaches Speckles Jr. and returns him safely to shore.

In the closing monologue, Speckles wishes a peaceful, happy life for his son.

Cast

Korean
Lee Hyung Suk ... Speckles (young)
Shin Yong-woo ... Speckles (subadult)
Goo Ja-Hyeong ... Speckles (adult)

English dub
C.D. Barnes ... Speckles (subadult-adult)
Veronica Taylor ... Speckles (young)

Production 
In 2008 the Korean TV channel Educational Broadcasting System (EBS) released a three-part CGI prehistoric life documentary dealing with cretaceous dinosaurs in Korea: Koreanosaurus (한반도의 공룡, Hanbandoui gongryong: Dinosaurs in the Korean Peninsula, not to be confused with the dinosaur genus Koreanosaurus). The documentary achieved much success among Korean audiences and the production team of Koreanosaurus launched the production of Speckles the Tarbosaurus.  Meanwhile, in 2009, the American 3D science-fiction film Avatar was released and its popularity inspired the creators of Speckles the Tarbosaurus to apply the technology to the film project. Location footage was filmed in New Zealand.

Reception 
The film attracted over 1 million admissions in 2012, becoming the second most successful local animation of all time. It was released to 37 territories and generated additional revenue through IPTV and DVD sales.

Titles by country 
 France: La Vie des dinosaures
 Germany: Speckles - Die Abenteuer eines Dinosauriers 3D
 Italy: Spotty il dinosauro 3D
 Korea: 점박이: 한반도의 공룡 3D
 United Kingdom: Speckles the Tarbosaurus
 United States: The Dino King — An Amazing Adventure
 Australia: Dino King: Speckles' Big Adventure
 Japan: 大恐竜時代 タルボサウルスvsティラノサウルス
Thai: ทาร์โบซอรัส: ไดโนเสาร์เจ้าพิภพ

Following 
Speckles: The Tarbosaurus is actually a follow-up to a documentary, Tarbosaurus: The Mightiest Ever (originally Koreanosaurus in 2008), which was internationally released in January, 2012, before Speckles: The Tarbosaurus was released. Both are directed by the same person, Han Sang Ho. The story of Tarbosaurus: The Mightiest Ever follows a male Tarbosaurus named Patch, the original mate of Speckles' mother. Like Speckles (A product of Patch's mate's 2nd marriage), Patch has the same color scheme, birthmarks, lost all his siblings when he was young and was left to fend for himself when he was old enough. Later he paired up with Speckles' Mother, they have 2 chicks but later on, all of them died and Patch himself also met the same fate, when he was fatally wounded by a Therizinosaurus. Meanwhile, Speckles' mother found a new mate who begat Quick's, the twins and finally Speckles. It's unknown what happened to Speckles' father, as he wasn't seen with his family nor mentioned in the first film. This may suggests that like Patch, Speckles' father was also killed, or he broke up with Speckles' mother.

Future 
On June 5, 2015, South Korea's Dream Search C&C announced that a sequel was in the works, which it will co-produce with China's Hengsheng Group. The sequel will also be in 3D and was expected to simultaneously open across Korean and Chinese theaters in summer of 2016, but it was rescheduled to summer of 2017.
Dino King: Journey to Fire Mountain will be directed by Han Sang-Ho, returning to the role from the first film, and have a running time of 92 minutes.

The official English title to the sequel was revealed to be Dino King 3D: Journey to Fire Mountain on a teaser poster. The film's story will revolve around Speckles raising his son until he is kidnapped, forcing Speckles to go on a journey across prehistoric Korea in search of his son. According to Michael Favelle, founder and CEO of Odin's Eye Entertainment, Dino King: Journey to Fire Mountain is currently in the final stages of post-production and will soon be ready to screen at the American Film Market in Santa Monica. The sequel is set for a wide release in the United States in the Summer of 2018.

Other than releasing the upcoming sequel, the film's producers aim to expand the Speckles brand into a global franchise with live performances, toys based on the films and its characters, and a TV/SvoD series.

References

External links 

2012 3D films
2012 films
2012 computer-animated films
Animated films about dinosaurs
Animated films set in prehistory
South Korean epic films
2010s adventure drama films
Films shot in New Zealand
2010s Korean-language films
South Korean animated films
South Korean adventure drama films
2012 drama films
2010s South Korean films